Candy Corn is a 2019 American horror film written and directed by Josh Hasty and starring Courtney Gains, Pancho Moler, P. J. Soles and Tony Todd.  In addition to acting in the film, Gains and Todd served as producer and executive producer respectively.

Cast
Tony Todd as Bishop Gate
P. J. Soles
Courtney Gains
Pancho Moler
Sky Elobar
Caleb Thomas
Madison Russ
Cy Creamer
Jimothy Beckholt
Nate Chaney
Patrick Ryan
Justin Mabry
Matt O’Neill
Jaime Gallagher

Release
The film was released in limited theaters in September 13, 2019. It was released on video-on-demand (VOD) and Blu-ray in September 17, 2019.

Reception
The film has  rating on Rotten Tomatoes.  Lorry Kitka of Film Threat gave it a 6 out of 10.

References

External links
 
 

American horror films
2019 horror films
2019 films
2010s English-language films
2010s American films